Nairoby Quezada Martínez, better known as Nairo, is an American streamer and retired professional Super Smash Bros. competitive player. He is widely considered one of the best players in the history of Super Smash Bros. Brawl, Super Smash Bros. for Wii U, and Super Smash Bros. Ultimate. After starting his career on Brawl in 2011, he quickly established himself as one of the best players in the United States, and became regarded as one of the best Brawl players in the world the following year; he would remain seen as a top Brawl player for the rest of his career, and would achieve similar success on Wii U and Ultimate following their respective releases.

Nairo won a total of eighteen major tournaments: seven for Brawl, nine for Wii U, and two for Ultimate. He also won eighteen Doubles Majors: four for Brawl, twelve for Wii U, and two for Ultimate; his frequent Wii U Doubles partner was ZeRo, while he teamed with a variety of players in other games. He primarily played Meta Knight in Brawl, Zero Suit Samus in Wii U, and Palutena in Super Smash Bros. Ultimate.

After the offline competitive Smash scene became inactive in the wake of the COVID-19 pandemic in early 2020, Nairo was accused of sexual misconduct by former Smash player CaptainZack the following July, leading to Nairo getting banned from competing in the Smash community and streaming on Twitch, and being dropped from his esports organization NRG Esports. After Nairo published a public response in October 2020 denying the accusations, public opinion shifted in his favor and he was unbanned from competition; however, he claimed to have no intention to return to the competitive Smash scene, and, to date, has not done so, choosing instead to focus on streaming on YouTube.

Career
Nairo gained national recognition for his skill in Super Smash Bros. Brawl at Apex 2012, defeating top players such as Yuta "Nietono" Uejima, before losing to Kenta "Otori" Ishikawa in Winners' Finals and Nietono in Losers' Finals, finishing 3rd out of 400 entrants. He won his first national-level Brawl tournament at SKTAR, defeating Eric "ESAM" Lew in winners' and grand finals. At Apex 2013, Nairo suffered an early defeat in winners' bracket, before making his way through losers' bracket and finally finishing 4th. Nairo would later win Apex 2014 concluding with a Meta Knight vs. Meta Knight match ("ditto") against Gonzalo "ZeRo" Barrios. Nairo is also known for frequently teaming up with Wyatt "ADHD" Beekman, often regarded as the strongest Brawl doubles team in the world, having won both Apex 2013 and 2014. Nairo is known to play the opposite of his brother, being very aggressive and rarely opting to go on the defensive.

Nairo signed to play for Team Liquid in August 2015 and later ended ZeRo's 56-tournament winning streak at the 2015 MLG World Finals. Nairo has won many national-level tournaments in Super Smash Bros. for Wii U, including Paragon Los Angeles 2015, Umebura FAT, and MLG 2015.

Nairo was one of the eight players competing in the Pokkén Tournament Early Access Competition Invitational by The Pokémon Company and Nintendo.

On August 16, 2016, Nairo left Team Liquid. It was announced on August 23, 2016, that Nairo would be joining NRG Esports as their first Super Smash Bros. player.

Nairo was also a surprise guest at the Super Smash Bros. Ultimate Invitational at E3 2018. Nairo had expressed his disappointment in not being one of the featured players to be invited to compete in the invitational, despite being a top player in Wii U. He made a surprise appearance at the invitational, when he was challenged to play against Olivia Holt, Mike Daniels, and Ember Moon, playing in a 3 vs. 1 team battle (without friendly fire). Nairo played as Snake, and beat the 3 celebrities, despite being on a team by himself.

Allegations of sexual misconduct, blackmail and cut ties

Initial allegations 
In July 2020, former professional Smash player Zack "CaptainZack" Lauth posted an allegation that he and Nairo had a sexual relationship in 2017, while CaptainZack was a minor, and that Nairo had subsequently sent CaptainZack payments to entice the latter not to reveal the allegations. Nairo subsequently deactivated his Twitter and Instagram accounts. The morning after the allegation was posted, NRG Esports cut ties with Nairo. Hours later, Nairo reactivated his Twitter account and issued an apology, claiming that his behavior was wrong, and that he "messed up tremendously". After posting his apology on Twitter, he went silent for several months and eventually deactivated his Twitter account again. He also stopped streaming on Twitch (eventually receiving a ban from the platform) and attending tournaments.

In September 2020, Tamim "tamim" Omary, a pro player and a friend of CaptainZack and fellow pro player Samsora, alleged that Zack was the one who initiated the relationship via non-consensual first contact while Nairo was asleep and requested the payments to stay silent, and that Samsora had pushed Zack into revealing the situation publicly for personal gain, with Omary stating that even though Samsora knew about the situation he continued to collaborate with Nairo on several occasions until the information was revealed publicly, and that "Zack had been in relationships with many adults, and Samsora ha[d] never cared" then. Samsora denied the allegations against him.

Response to the allegations 
On October 28, 2020, Nairo reactivated his Twitter account and released a statement, claiming CaptainZack's allegations to be "completely false" as well as explaining the story from his perspective. Nairo detailed how CaptainZack allegedly sexually assaulted him by performing oral sex on him while he was asleep. Nairo claimed that he had told him to stop but CaptainZack refused and that he stopped once Nairo pushed him off. CaptainZack later allegedly blackmailed him into paying him 3 payments of $2000, $275, and $350. Nairo also explained the tremendous toll the initial and subsequent events had taken on his mental health. He claimed to have a 30-page document that includes details and evidence to clear his name. While the initial response from the community was mixed, some pro Smash players such as James "VoiD" Makekau-Tyson and Brian "Cosmos" Kalu tweeted that they had seen the document, and corroborated Nairo's version of events, while other prominent players such as MkLeo and Maister tweeted their support.

Return to streaming and retirement from competitive play 
On February 19, 2021, Nairo uploaded a video to his YouTube channel announcing that a legal agreement had been reached between both parties and he intended to return to streaming. He has also submitted an appeal to his Twitch ban. Following this announcement, many players began requesting Nairo's ban from tournaments and Twitch be overturned, and the hashtag #UnbanNairo would start trending a few days later, reaching over 200,000 tweets and even managing to make it to the top of the trending list for a few hours.

Following Nairo's statement, tournament organizations such as 2GGaming and Collision would lift Nairo's ban from their events after processing his appeal. However, Twitch has not unbanned his channel to this date.

On April 8, 2021, Nairo streamed for the first time in nearly a year, hosting his stream on YouTube, as Twitch had not unbanned him by that time. His stream peaked at over 26,000 simultaneous viewers, and he gained over 2,200 YouTube members in just over 6 hours. After a month of streaming, Nairo has earned nearly 630,000 distinct viewers who tuned in at some point in his first stream. However, he has explicitly stated that while he will return to streaming and content creation, he has no interest in returning to the Super Smash Bros. community, indicating that he has officially retired from competitive play.

Personal life
Nairo has a brother, Kelvin "Ksizzle" Quezada, who also plays Super Smash Bros.
He is of Dominican descent.

References

External links
 
 

Living people
People from Passaic, New Jersey
Super Smash Bros. Brawl players
American esports players
Team Liquid players
NRG Esports players
American people of Dominican Republic descent
Super Smash Bros. Ultimate players
Super Smash Bros. for Wii U players